"Hear Me Now" is a song recorded by Brazilian DJs Alok and Bruno Martini featured the Brazilian-American recording artist Zeeba. The song was released on 21 October 2016 via Spinnin' Records.

Composition
Noiseprn described the genre of the song as 'Brazilian bass'.

Music video
An official music video for the song was released on YouTube by Alok and Spinnin' Records, the latter having over 370 million views as of July 2019.

Track listing
Digital download
 "Hear Me Now" – 3:12
 "Hear Me Now" (Club Edit) – 5:34

Charts

Weekly charts

Year-end charts

Certifications

References

2016 singles
2016 songs
Alok (DJ) songs
Electronic songs
Spinnin' Records singles